Enteromius kamolondoensis is a species of ray-finned fish in the genus Enteromius from the Democratic Republic of Congo.

References 

 

Enteromius
Taxa named by Max Poll
Fish described in 1938
Endemic fauna of the Democratic Republic of the Congo